Udea nordmani is a species of moth in the family Crambidae. It is found on the Canary Islands.

References

Moths described in 1935
nordmani